Zoltán is a Hungarian masculine given name. The name days for this name are 8 March and 23 June in Hungary, and 7 April in Slovakia.

Zoltána is the feminine version.

Notable people 
 Zoltán of Hungary
 Zoltan Bathory, guitarist of heavy metal band Five Finger Death Punch
 Zoltán Lajos Bay
 Zoltán Berczik, six times European Champion in table-tennis.
 Zoltán Czibor
 Zoltán Czukor
 Zoltán Dani
 Zoltán Gera (actor)
 Zoltán Gera (footballer) – Fulham F.C.
 Zoltán Halmay
 Zoltán Horváth (disambiguation) – several people
 Zoltan Istvan – American writer and futurist
 Zoltan Kaszas – American comedian
 Zoltán Kammerer
 Zoltán Kocsis, pianist, conductor, and composer
 Zoltán Kodály, composer, creator of the Kodály-method.
 Zoltán Korda
 Zoltán Kovács (ice hockey), ice hockey coach and administrator, recipient of the Paul Loicq Award
 Zoltán Lajos Bay, physicist.
 Zoltán Latinovits, Hungarian actor, director.
 Zoltán Magyar – 2-time Olympic gold medalist in pommel horse gymnast. The Magyar spindle and the Magyar travel was named after him.
 Zoltán Meskó – Nazi politician.
 Zoltan Mesko (American football)
 Zoltán Mujahid
 Zoltan Pali, American architect based in Los Angeles, California
 Zoltán Ozoray Schenker – Hungarian Olympic champion saber fencer
 Zoltán Sebescen – Hungarian-German footballer and coach
 Zoltan Somogyi – creator of the Mercury programming language
 Zoltán Szabó (disambiguation), several people
 Zoltán Takács (musician) (born 1980), Hungarian musician and record producer
 Zoltán Takács (footballer) (born 1983), Hungarian footballer
 Zoltán Takács (toxinologist), Hungarian-born toxinologist and tropical adventurer
 Zoltan Teglas – front man of the California-based band Ignite
 Zoltán Tildy – president of Hungary after World War II
 Zoltán Varga (disambiguation)
 Zoltán Zana aka Ganxsta Zolee Hungarian musician.
 Zoltan is a village in Ghidfalău Commune, Covasna County, Romania
 Zoltán is the Hungarian name for Mihai Viteazu village, Saschiz Commune, Mureș County, Romania, formerly called Zoltan in Romanian.

Films
 Zoltan, Hound of Dracula, alternative title for Dracula's Dog, a 1978 American horror film starring Michael Pataki and José Ferrer

Fictional characters
 Zoltan (Dude, Where's My Car?)
 Zoltan, a tomato character in the animated television series Attack of the Killer Tomatoes
 Zoltan, an alien race in the video game FTL: Faster Than Light
 Zoltan, the name of a pet raven in Stephen King's novel The Gunslinger
 Zoltan, a talking stuffed wolf character in the television series Young Dracula
 Zoltan Akkanen, the main antagonist in the 2018 anime film Mobile Suit Gundam Narrative
 Zoltan Amadeus, a supervillain from the Spider-Man and His Amazing Friends episode "Attack of the Arachnoid"
 Zoltan Grundy, a recurring character in the Disney Channel sitcom A.N.T. Farm
 Zoltan Karpathy, a main character in the My Fair Lady musical
 Zoltan Chivay, a recurring character from The Witcher novels and The Witcher (video game) series
 Zoltan Mahany, a recurring character in the Nero Wolfe novels by Rex Stout

Other uses 
 Zoltan (hand gesture), a hand sign originally used by characters in Dude, Where's My Car?, later used as a celebration by the Pittsburgh Pirates in Major League Baseball as well as by other athletes
 Zoltan, a Fortuneteller-machine.

See also

 Zoltar (disambiguation)

Hungarian masculine given names